First Time for Everything is the debut studio album by American country music band Little Texas. Released in 1992 on Warner Bros. Records, the album was certified gold by the RIAA for sales of 500,000 copies. Five singles were released from it: "Some Guys Have All the Love", the title track, "You and Forever and Me", "What Were You Thinkin'", and "I'd Rather Miss You". Respectively, these reached #8, #13, #5, #17 and #16 on the Hot Country Songs charts.

Track listing

Personnel

Little Texas
Del Gray - drums
Porter Howell - electric guitar, slide guitar, acoustic guitar, 6 string bass, background vocals
Dwayne O'Brien - acoustic guitar, background vocals
Duane Propes - bass guitar, background vocals
Tim Rushlow - lead vocals
Brady Seals - piano, keyboards, Hammond organ, lead vocals, background vocals

Additional Musicians
Larry Byrom - acoustic guitar on "Some Guys Have All the Love"
Sonny Garrish - steel guitar
Dann Huff - electric guitar
Brent Rowan - electric guitar 
James Stroud - percussion

Track information and credits verified from Discogs, AllMusic, and the album's liner notes.

Charts

Album

Singles

References

1992 debut albums
Little Texas (band) albums
Warner Records albums
Albums produced by James Stroud